is a Japanese yuri manga written and illustrated by Akiko Morishima. It was first serialized in Ichijinsha's Comic Yuri Hime in 2007 as a series of one-shots before being collecting into a single tankōbon volume. Morishima went on to revisit similar themes and characters that first appeared in The Conditions of Paradise in later one-shots that were also collected into single tankōbon volumes as Ruriiro no Yume and  Hajimete, Kanojo to. Seven Seas Entertainment licensed all three volumes for English-language release and titled them collectively as The Conditions of Paradise.

Synopsis 
Sarina and Sumi are best friends and total opposites. Sarina is an organized office worker, while Sumi is a carefree travelling freelance writer. Despite their different lifestyles the two have remained close, with Sarina always offering Sumi a place to crash between travelling. However, their relationship is tested as they navigate between being friends with benefits and having genuine feelings for each other.

Media

Manga

Reception 
The Conditions of Paradise received relatively positive reviews, with Reuben Baron of Comic Book Resources surmising that "While The Conditions of Paradise isn't aiming hard on heavy realism, there's an authenticity to the perspective behind its light escapism." Anime News Network gave the first volume an overall B rating, noting that while the series isn't quite as captivating as Morishima's full-length stories, it is "a very nice read nonetheless"  Comics Beat also felt the stories were genuinely enjoyable, however they noted that they lacked any kind of edge which might possibly disappoint readers; "those who were hoping that an adult-focused collection would offer a little more than the usual feel-good yuri fare, this is likely not going to satisfy that craving."

References

External links 
 Official English website
 

2007 manga
LGBT in anime and manga
Seven Seas Entertainment titles
Yuri (genre) anime and manga
2000s LGBT literature